Hydrogen thioperoxide, also called oxadisulfane or sulfur hydride hydroxide, is the chemical with the structure H–S–O–H. It can be considered as the simple sulfur-substituted analog of the common hydrogen peroxide (H–O–O–H) chemical, and as the simplest hydrogen chalcogenide containing more than one type of chalcogen. The chemical has been described as the "missing link" between hydrogen peroxide and hydrogen disulfide (H–S–S–H), though it is substantially less stable than either of the other two. It is the inorganic parent structure of the sulfenic acid class of organic compounds (R–S–O–H) and also the oxadisulfide linkage (R1–S–O–R2), where "R" is any organic structure. Sulfur is present in oxidation state 0.

Formation 
Hydrogen thioperoxide has been synthesized in labs by photolysis of a mixture of ozone and hydrogen sulfide frozen in argon at 8 K and by pyrolysis of di-tert-butyl sulfoxide.
Yet another synthesis is by an electric discharge through water and sulfur.

In the interstellar medium there is a hypothesis that hydrogen thioperoxide is formed in a reaction of sulfur monoxide with the trihydrogen cation, dihydrogen and an electron. Another possible route, is sulfur monoxide reacting with atomic hydrogen to form HOS and HSO which in turn can add another hydrogen atom. However this mechanism probably needs a dust grain to take away excess energy.

Properties
Hydrogen thioperoxide molecules have a gauche conformation. They are unsymmetrical, but have a low barrier to convert from left-hand to right-hand forms, so that the molecule can tunnel between the forms.

The measurements of the bond-lengths in hydrogen thioperoxide are H–S 1.3420 Å, S–O 1.6616 Å, O–H 0.9606 Å. The bond angles are H–S–O 98.57°, S–O–H 107.19°. The H–S and O–H bonds are twisted at 90.41°.

Reactions
Two molecules of hydrogen thioperoxide can undergo cyclocondensation to form sulfinothioic acid HS(=O)SH and water.

Hydrosulfide  can react with HSOH to yield disulfane HSSH.

References 

Peroxides
Sulfur compounds
Hydrogen compounds